Neuse Township (also designated Township 13) is one of twenty townships within Wake County, North Carolina, United States. As of the 2010 census, Neuse Township had a population of 73,617, a 52.6% increase over 2000.

Neuse Township, occupying  in north-central Wake County, is almost completely occupied by portions of the city of Raleigh.

References

Townships in Wake County, North Carolina
Townships in North Carolina